LXLE is a Linux distribution based upon the most recent Ubuntu/Lubuntu LTS release, using the LXDE desktop environment. LXLE is a lightweight distro, with a focus on visual aesthetics, that works well on both old and new hardware.

Reception 
In a January 2014 review in Full Circle Magazine, Gabriele Tettamanzi noted that LXLE has some minor localization issues but otherwise described it as a nice "light and fast" desktop "rich" with software and "stable".

Jesse Smith reviewed LXLE 12.04.3 for DistroWatch Weekly:

Jesse Smith also reviewed LXDE 14.04, concluding, "Generally speaking, I enjoyed my time with LXLE. The distribution got off to a good start with a smooth installation process and the project features clear documentation and release notes, letting people know exactly what to expect from the distribution. I like the LXDE desktop as I feel it does an excellent job of balancing user friendliness, performance and features."

In reviewing LXLE 18.04.3, Marius Nestor of Softpedia said, "LXLE features unique Expose, Aero Snap, and Quick Launch apps, random or interval wallpaper changers, theme consistency throughout the system, as well as numerous other tweaks and additions you won't find in other distros. The system is very fast and boots in less than one minute, and it's perfect to revive that old PC."

The current version LXLE Focal is based on Ubuntu 20.04.4 LTS with LXDE.

Releases

References

External links 
 
 
 

Linux distributions
Operating system distributions bootable from read-only media
Ubuntu derivatives